El Idrissi high school in  is a high school in Algiers, Algeria. It is a secondary education school located near the Place du 1er Mai.

The high school has two major streams, the scientific one, having four options

-Mathematics 

-Biology sciences

-Technical sciences ( Civil, Mechanical, Electrical and Chemical engineering)

-Economic  science

And the literary one leading to :

-Languages

See also
 :Category:Alumni of El Idrissi High School

Schools in Algeria
High schools in Algeria